Selected Ambient Works Volume II is the second studio album by Aphex Twin, the pseudonym of British electronic musician Richard D. James. It was released by Warp in March 1994. Billed as a follow-up to James' debut Selected Ambient Works 85–92, the album differs in sound by being largely beatless ambient music. James claimed that it was inspired by lucid dreaming, and likened the music to "standing in a power station on acid."

Selected Ambient Works Volume II was not especially well received by critics upon release, but peaked at No. 11 on the UK Albums Chart. However, its stature has grown considerably in subsequent years and it later placed on various best of the decade lists by publications such as Rolling Stone, Spin, and Pitchfork.

Background

Composition
James stated that the sounds on Selected Ambient Works Volume II were inspired by lucid dreams, and that upon awaking, he would attempt to re-create the sounds and record them. He claimed to have natural synaesthesia, which contributed to this album. James described the album as being "like standing in a power station on acid"; he continued that "if you just stand in the middle of a really massive one, you get a really weird presence and you've got that hum. You just feel electricity around you. That's totally dreamlike for me. It's just like a right strange dimension."

Volume II differs significantly from the first volume in the series, in that it consists of lengthy, textured ambient compositions with sparing use of percussion and occasional vocal samples, in a vein Rolling Stone related to Brian Eno's early ambient works and John Cage's minimalism. The album itself makes liberal use of microtonal musical tunings, which James was investing himself in at the time. The 22nd track features a sample taken from an interview with a woman who had murdered her husband; the tape having been pinched from a police station by a friend of James' who worked there as a cleaner.

Simon Reynolds commented that on Volume II James changed styles "from the idyllic, Satie-esque naivete of early tracks like 'Analogue Bubblebath' to clammy, foreboding sound-paintings." Reynolds stated that, along with other artists such as Seefeel, David Toop and Max Eastley, James had moved from "rave into the vicinity of "isolationism", a term coined by Kevin Martin to label music which "breaks with all of ambient's feel-good premises. Isolationism is ice-olationist, offering cold comfort. Instead of pseudopastoral peace, it evokes an uneasy silence: the uncanny calm before catastrophe, the deathly quiet of aftermath."

Artwork
The artwork for the album was designed by Paul Nicholson, who was credited as Prototype 21 in the liner notes. He stated in an interview with Resident Advisor that the images were taken by "Richard's girlfriend at the time, Sam" and that most of the photographs were taken in a flat that the three were all living in together. All images are in sepia tone, save the one used for "Blue Calx", which features the track's name against a blue field (this was changed to a plain light blue background in the US version). Different crops of the images were used for the cassette booklet and vinyl labels. Furthermore, many images were altered for the US CD pressing: several of the blurry or out-of-focus photographs were replaced with entirely new, in-focus images; and the image for the 19th track was replaced with a blank space. The fan-created titles in the tracklist below are based on the original UK artwork.

The front cover is the result of James scratching the Aphex Twin logo onto the back of a leather travel case, which Sam took a picture of. The textual Aphex logo is a "broken" version of the one Nicholson had designed for several EPs by James.

Of the pie charts and size of the photographs in the artwork, Nicholson said that they were "related to the track signatures, how long they were." The timecodes of a track would be converted into a decimal, then into the percentage of the total length of the side of the record the track is on, and then into a degree to be used on the pie chart. All six pie charts were colour-coded, and those colours are used throughout the artwork, including the textless CD and vinyl labels.

Release
Selected Ambient Works Volume II was released in the United Kingdom by Warp on 7 March 1994. Warp released Selected Ambient Works Volume II on double compact disc, double cassette and triple vinyl, and later also on digital formats for download. The album charted in the United Kingdom on 19 March 1994 where it debuted and peaked at the 11th position on the charts. The album sold 9,336 copies in its first week of release. It stayed on the charts for three weeks. The CD pressings omit the 19th track for space reasons. Sire released the album on compact disc on 12 April 1994. The US pressing omits the 4th and the 19th tracks. The album was re-issued on vinyl by 1972 Records on 6 March 2012, though the master was made from a US CD copy (see tracklist for details). In 2017, James added the album to his own web store, and included not only a 26th track, but made the 19th track available in a digital format for the first time since its inclusion on an ambient music CD compilation entitled Excursions in Ambience: The Third Dimension, also released in 1994.

By July 1994, it had sold over 60,000 copies outside the United States.

Reception

Spin gave the album a positive review, with critic Simon Reynolds stating that the album has "plenty of the shimmeringly euphoric and majestically melancholy tunes that have won James so many devout fans," but that it "will leave you not so much blissed as spooked out." Rolling Stones Jon Wiederhorn stated that "While many of his disciples have done little more than propel New Age atmospheres into the computer age, producing comforting but often emotionless elevator music, James has used the medium to confront his shadowy demons, exploring realms of spooky, textured sound." He concluded that the album "provides a visionary perspective on ambient electronic music." Clark Collis of Select stated that "Anyone who thinks they know what to expect on the basis of 'Volume I' might care to sit down, have a nice cup of tea and prepare themselves for a shock." Collis noted the album was not successful "as a conventional dance record", but "as an album to wallow in at 5am while watching the wallpaper conduct a heated argument with the lightshade, it is indeed the knees of the bee."

Other reviews were less favourable. Robert Christgau, writing in The Village Voice, critiqued positive reviews of the album by fellow critics Frank Owen, Simon Reynolds, and J. D. Considine, contending that "James is rarely as rich as good [Brian] Eno, not to mention good Eno-Hassell or Eno-Budd", and that "these experiments are considerably thinner ("purer," Owen wishes) and more static ("pulse dreamily," Considine dreams) than the overpriced juvenilia on the import-only Volume I." Entertainment Weekly critic Charles Aaron wrote that "At its best [the album] is an avant-garde score in search of a postapocalyptic theater piece, à la Philip Glass. More often, it's chamber music for humorless cyber-nerds".

Retrospective reviews
At the end of the decade, Selected Ambient Works Volume II was included on several publications' lists of top albums of the 1990s including Rolling Stone and Spin. Commenting on the audience's reaction of the album in 1999, Simon Reynolds stated that "many in the Aphex cult were thrown for a loop" and that "Aphex aficionados remain divided" on the album. Rolling Stone stated the album was James creating "an enriched, wraparound style of burp-and-whoosh programming, the perfect soundtrack for pulling the pieces of your brain back together after spilling them all over the club floor. The first dance album to celebrate the rhythms in your head." Spin placed both Selected Ambient Works 85–92 and Selected Ambient Works Volume II at number 56 on their list of the top albums of the 1990s, calling it "an awe-inspiring feat of avant-techno texturology". Online music magazine Pitchfork placed the album at number 62 on their list of top albums of the 1990s, stating that it "spurred on one of the great trajectories of pop music in the 1990s, influencing everyone from Radiohead to Timbaland". Pitchfork later ranked the album second on their 2016 list of the best ambient music albums of all time. Giving added historical context of Volume II initially confusing some listeners expecting a techno LP based on its name, Resident Advisor gave the album a 5/5 for its 25th anniversary, stating that it brought "atmospheres to life with intensely vivid sonic textures" and "[as] artists and fans alike, we all owe something to this strange masterpiece."

Legacy and influence
Pitchfork noted that Selected Ambient Works Volume II was "a very early example of a record being anticipated, experienced, and, ultimately, analyzed in minute detail through online communication." Pitchfork noted that the Electronic mailing list titled IDM (Intelligent dance music) had a profound influence on how the album would be received in the future, noting that the community's influence has to do with the album's mysterious non-titles. List member Greg Eden, who kept a detailed discography, gave the tracks names based on a word or two that related to the corresponding images. Eden would later work for Warp, the original label that released Selected Ambient Works Volume II.

Simon Reynolds noted that the album signaled a shift in techno and ambient music toward a darker sound reminiscent of Brian Eno's notion of "environmental music".

A book written by Marc Weidenbaum (a music journalist and former editor of Tower Records's in-store magazine Pulse!) about the album was released in the 33⅓ series on 13 February 2013. The series are short books inspired by or focused on albums and are generally written as longform essays.

Track listing
None of the tracks are given titles on the original release of the album, instead representing each track with photographs in the album's artwork. The titles on digital releases of the album simply number the songs from 1-24. The track "Blue Calx" was released prior to the album on a compilation, from which the name is taken. Unofficial titles based on the photographs were popularised by a fan, Greg Eden, and are indicated below. 

The 2017 bonus track "th1  [evnslower]" is known from its digital release and "Radiator" was officially named on Warp's Peel Session 2. 

CD pressings

UK Vinyl and cassette pressings

Certifications

Personnel
Credits adapted from Selected Ambient Works Volume II liner notes.
Richard D James – writer, producer, liner notes, photography
Prototype 21 – design
 "Sam" – photographs (not credited in liner notes)

See also
 1994 in British music
 Music of the United Kingdom (1990s)

Notes

References

External links
 

Aphex Twin albums
1994 albums
Warp (record label) albums
Sire Records albums
Ambient albums
Sequel albums